Ganna Pind is a village in the Phillaur tehsil of Jalandhar District of the Indian state of Punjab. The village is administered by the Sarpanch, an elected representative.

Demographics 
According to the 2011 Census, Ganna Pind has a population of 4,465. The village has a literacy rate of 71.54%, higher than the average literacy rate of Punjab.

Most villagers belong to a Schedule Caste (SC), comprising 74.51% of the total.

Transport

Rail 

Airport 
The nearest international airport is located in Amritsar.

References 

Villages in Jalandhar district
Villages in Phillaur tehsil